Bloater can refer to:
 Bloater (herring), a term for herring that is smoked whole;
The Yarmouth Bloaters, a defunct motorcycle team named for the herring;
Great Yarmouth Town F.C. commonly known by the nickname The Bloaters;
 Coregonus hoyi, a freshwater whitefish from the Great Lakes;
Several related species of cisco from the Great Lakes, such as the kiyi
 A zombie-like enemy in The Last of Us video game, in which it is the fourth and most dangerous stage of the Cordyceps infection.
 The Bloater, a 1968 novel by Rosemary Tonks